Jérémy Chardy and Łukasz Kubot were the defending champions, but they chose to compete in Hamburg instead. 

Marcel Granollers and David Marrero won the title, defeating Marcus Daniell and Marcelo Demoliner in the final, 6–2, 6–3.

Seeds

Draw

Draw

External Links
 Main Draw

Swedish Open - Doubles
2016 Doubles